Meneng (or Menen) is a district located in the Meneng Constituency in the country of Nauru. The constituency elects 2 members to the Parliament of Nauru in Yaren.

Geography
The district is located in the southeast of the island, covering an area of 3.1 km². It has a population of 1,400. Meneng District has 18 villages, the most of any district in Nauru.

Local features
Features in Meneng include:

 The Menen Hotel, one of the island's four hotels
 the wireless station
 the State House (presidential residence; recently burned down)
 the Government Printing Office
 the Meneng Stadium
 Australian Nauru Detention Centre

Education

Meneng Infant School is in Meneng. The primary and secondary schools serving all of Nauru are Yaren Primary School in Yaren District (years 1-3), Nauru Primary School in Meneng District (years 4-6), Nauru College in Denigomodu District (years 7-9), and Nauru Secondary School (years 10-12) in Yaren District.

The current building of Nauru Primary School opened on October 6, 2016. Canstruct, an Australian firm, built the two-story building, which has eight classrooms. The building, specially designed for Nauruan weather, with ceiling fans and special airflow, may house up to 400 students and is resistant to natural disasters.

Notable people
Lionel Aingimea, the President of Nauru, is from Meneng.

See also
 List of settlements in Nauru

References

External links

Districts of Nauru
Populated places in Nauru